Schumm is an unincorporated community in Van Wert County, in the U.S. state of Ohio.

History
A post office called Schumm was established in 1881, and remained in operation until 1953. The namesake Schumm family settled the area in 1837.

References

Unincorporated communities in Van Wert County, Ohio
Populated places established in 1837
1837 establishments in Ohio
Unincorporated communities in Ohio